Chiloglottis valida, commonly known as the large bird orchid or common bird orchid, is a species of orchid endemic to south-eastern Australia.It has two dark green leaves and a single greenish purple to purplish brown flower with six to ten blackish, column-like calli on the labellum.

Description
Flowering occurs from October to February.

Taxonomy and naming
Chiloglottis valida was first formally described in 1991 by David Jones from a specimen collected in Namadgi National Park and the description was published in Australian Orchid Research. The specific epithet (valida) is a Latin word meaning "strong", "sound" or "powerful", in reference to this species being the largest in the genus.

Distribution and habitat
The large bird orchid is widespread and common, growing in a range of habitats from coastal to subalpine areas. It is most common in Victoria where it grows throughout the state, except in the far west. In New South Wales and the Australian Capital Territory it is found south from the Brindabella Range and it grows on King Island in Tasmania.

References

External links 

valida
Orchids of New South Wales
Orchids of the Australian Capital Territory
Plants described in 1991
Orchids of Victoria (Australia)